Elizabeth Sarah Macneal (born 16 October 1988) is a British writer, author of the award-winning book The Doll Factory, described as a "lush Victorian fiction".

Life
Elizabeth was born in Edinburgh on 16 October 1988 and is the oldest of four children to award-winning Edinburgh architect Lorn Macneal and his wife Catharine. She was educated at Fettes College in Edinburgh.

She studied English literature at Somerville College, Oxford. After graduating, she did further postgraduate study at the University of East Anglia as a Malcolm Bradbury Scholar, where she gained an MA.

Elizabeth is a successful ceramicist, and this has supported her whilst working on the novel. She is based in Limehouse in east London.

The Doll Factory
The book was first published on 2 May 2019 in UK and on 13 August in the USA.

The book explores the complex relationship between Iris Whittle and her artist-admirer, Louis Frost, and Silas Reed, a taxidermist and curio-collector. It is set in London at the time of the Great Exhibition. It links to the Pre-Raphaelite Brotherhood and the character of Iris is influenced by the Pre-Raphaelite model, Lizzie Siddal.

The book was initially published by Picador in the United Kingdom. In the United States it is published by Emily Bestler Books. It has already (August 2019) been translated into 29 languages and the TV-rights have been bought by Buccaneer Media. It is also available as an audio-book.

Circus of Wonders
Again set in Victorian England, Elizabeth's second book released in 2021 looks at the world of circus "freaks" and atrocity exhibitions, but from the perspective of one of the persons chosen for such a role due their imperfections, but has a very unconventional approach rather than the standard heroes and villains. The book was published on 13 May 2021.

Awards and honours

Caledonian Novel Award 2018 (pre-publication)
The Times bestseller
Sunday Times Top Ten bestseller
Radio 2 Book Club pick
Radio 4 Book at Bedtime
Radio 4 Book of the Week
UK bestseller in Waterstones, Foyles, W. H. Smith and Amazon.com
US bestseller in Indie Bound, Barnes & Noble, Amazon.com and Bam!

References

External links

1988 births
Living people
People educated at Fettes College
Alumni of Somerville College, Oxford
Alumni of the University of East Anglia
British writers
Writers from Edinburgh
Scottish women writers
21st-century Scottish women writers